"Truth Is" is the first single released by Fantasia from her debut album, Free Yourself. The song peaked at number twenty-one on the Billboard Hot 100 and had great success on the US R&B 100 chart, peaking at number two and setting a record for the longest stay at number one for a female artist on the Billboard Adult R&B Airplay chart, with fourteen consecutive weeks.  In 2006, Truth Is, along with "Free Yourself", won an ASCAP R&B/Hip-Hop award.

The song's distinctive piano line is sampled from "Highways of My Life" by The Isley Brothers.

The song appears in the game Karaoke Revolution Party.

Release and promotion
Single was released on December 7, 2004, for digital download, CD and 12" vinyl. On 7" vinyl, its B-side was "Baby Mama" while on 12" vinyl and some CD versions "It's All Good" was its B-side. It was released in a digital remix EP format (Dance Vault Mixes) on March 29, 2005. It was promoted by a music video, which was released in 2004 and numerous live performances.

Commercial performance
Single peaked at number twenty-one on US Billboard Hot 100 singles chart. It also topped the Adult R&B Airplay chart for fourteen consecutive weeks, setting a record for the longest stay at number one for a female artist on that chart. It also peaked at number two on US Billboards Hot R&B/Hip-Hop Songs chart. In 2006, it won an ASCAP Rhythm and Soul Award for Most Performed Song, along with "Free Yourself".

Track listings
"Dance Vault Mixes - "Truth Is" digital EP "Truth Is" (Nate Skaten Radio Edit) – 4:02
 "Truth Is" (Nate Skaten Instrumental) – 4:01
 "Truth Is" (Nate Skaten Acappella) – 3:48
 "Truth Is" (Nate Skaten Mixshow) – 4:58US promo CD single "Truth Is" (Album Version) – 3:53
 "Truth Is" (Instrumental) – 3:53
 "Truth Is" (Call Out Hook) – 0:10US 7" single'
 "Truth Is" – 3:53
 "Baby Mama" – 4:15

Charts

Awards and nominations

Release history

References

2004 singles
Fantasia Barrino songs
Music videos directed by Diane Martel
Song recordings produced by Soulshock and Karlin
2004 songs
J Records singles
Contemporary R&B ballads
Soul ballads
2000s ballads
Torch songs
Songs written by Soulshock
Songs written by Ronald Isley
Songs written by O'Kelly Isley Jr.
Songs written by Rudolph Isley
Songs written by Ernie Isley